Away All Boats is a 1956 American war film directed by Joseph Pevney and starring Jeff Chandler, George Nader, Lex Barker, and Julie Adams. He was encouraged in his writing by Carl Sandburg, who had read some of Dodson’s letters, written in the Pacific. The book (and film) is about the crew of the Belinda (APA-22), an amphibious attack transport. The book became a best seller. The film was produced by Universal Pictures.

Plot

The story of USS Belinda (APA-22), launched late 1943 with regular-Navy Captain Jebediah S. Hawks (Jeff Chandler) and ex-merchant mariner Lieutenant Dave MacDougall (George Nader) as boat commander. Despite personal friction, the two have plenty with which to deal as the only experienced officers on board during the ship's shakedown cruise. Almost laughable incompetence gradually improves, but the crew remains far from perfect when the ship sees action, landing troops on enemy beachheads. Few anticipate the challenges in store at Okinawa.

Cast
Jeff Chandler as Capt. Jebediah S. Hawks
George Nader as Lieut. Dave MacDougall
Lex Barker as Commander Quigley
Julie Adams as Nadine MacDougall
Keith Andes as Doctor Bell
William Reynolds as Ensign Kruger
Richard Boone as Lieut. Fraser
Charles McGraw as Lieut. Mike O'Bannion
Jock Mahoney as Alvick
Hal Baylor as Chaplain Hughes 
John McIntire as Old Man / Film's narrator
Frank Faylen as Chief Phillip P. 'Pappy' Moran
James Westerfield as 'Boats' Torgeson
Don Keefer as Ensign Twitchell 
Uncredited
Clint Eastwood as Corpsman
David Janssen as Talker

Production
Film rights were bought by Universal, whose president Edward Muhl said the movie version would be Universal's most expensive of the year.

The first choice for the lead role was Clark Gable.

George Nader had twice taken roles that Chandler refused. This was the first time the two actors had worked together.

The armed services had not been pleased with their portrayal in From Here to Eternity or The Caine Mutiny. However the Navy was worried about declining recruitment numbers and Universal received its full cooperation for the film, including an opportunity to photograph maneuvers and mock attacks in March 1955 in the Caribbean and on Vieques. The movie was filmed aboard . It is most notable for its realistic and terrifying depictions of Japanese kamikaze attacks on U.S. Navy ships during the last year of World War II in the Pacific Theater.  The kamikaze attack scene was later reused in the 1976 film Midway.

The Navy also granted a two-week leave of absence for Ralph Scalzo, a landing boat coxswain, who took part in filming in the Caribbean and was needed for added closeup shots in Hollywood.

Away All Boats is one of the few films made in VistaVision at a studio other than Paramount. The film made use of the Perspecta stereo process for its soundtrack.

Clint Eastwood's role is a brief speaking one (with one line of dialog spoken by another actor), as a Navy medical corpsman assisting the ship's captain after he is severely wounded while trying to save his ship.

The script, script revisions, and status reports dealing with the Department of Defense Film and Television liaison office is kept in the Georgetown University Library Department of Defense Film Collection.

Reception
A review in The New York Times by Bosley Crowther found the early scenes in the film confusing, particularly the motivation of the characters played by Jeff Chandler (Captain Jebediah Hawks) and Lex Barker (Commander Quigley).  He also found it an efficient service film in which “all the confusions are adjusted and everybody comes out a hero in the end”.

Home media
NBC made a color documentary about the making of the film.

A record with some of Frank Skinner’s music from the film was released by Decca Records in May 1956. Participants included Al Hibbler (who sang a theme from the film score) and an orchestra conducted by Jack Pleis. Decca released this on 78 rpm 29950 and 45 rpm 9-29950.

MCA Home Video released a VHS version in HiFi sound in 1986. Good Times Video released a VHS version in LP on March 2, 1998.

Good Times Video released a DVD on May 1, 2001. This was in full-screen rather than the VistaVision widescreen and may have been a copy of the earlier Good Times VHS release.

See also
List of American films of 1956

References

 Dodson, Kenneth. Away All Boats, Little, Brown and Company, December 1953.
 Crowther, Bosley. “Screen: Away All Boats”, The New York Times, August 17, 1956, p. 14.
 Shenk, Robert; “Away All Boats” in Jill B. Gidmark. Encyclopedia of American Literature of the Sea and Great Lakes. p. 26, Greenwood, 2001. (A description of the novel on which the movie was based).

External links

1956 films
1956 war films
American war drama films
1950s English-language films
Films based on American novels
Films based on military novels
Films directed by Joseph Pevney
Universal Pictures films
Films about the United States Navy in World War II
Pacific War films
Films shot in Puerto Rico
Films scored by Heinz Roemheld
Films scored by Frank Skinner
1950s American films